Thomas Pope (October 6, 1825 – June 29, 1863) was a Canadian independent politician and served as the eleventh mayor of Quebec City. He was in power from January 22, 1861, to January 29, 1863 (a total of two years and seven days), before being replaced by Adolphe Guillet dit Tourangeau. He replaced Hector-Louis Langevin and was the city's last non-Francophone mayor.

Early years

Pope was born on October 6, 1825, in Prescott, Upper Canada, to Scottish immigrants and was later educated in Scotland before moving to Canada East.

Legal and political career
After returning from his studies he became a lawyer after articling under Jean-François-Joseph Duval, whom later became Chief Justice of Quebec. Before becoming mayor Pope served on Quebec City Council from 1858 to 1861.

Death
Pope died in office on June 29, 1863  and buried at Notre-Dame-de-Belmont Cemetery in Quebec City.

Legacy

A short residential street, rue Thomas-Pope, in Quebec City is named for him.

References

French Quebecers
Mayors of Quebec City
19th-century Canadian politicians
1825 births
1863 deaths
Canadian people of Scottish descent